Alcyon was a French fishing trawler that was seized in the Second World War by the Kriegsmarine for use as a harbour defence boat and later a vorpostenboot, serving as Boot 10 Alcyon and V 420 Alcyon. She was bombed and sunk in the Gironde on 3 August 1943.

Description
The engine was made by Alblasserdamsche Machienfabriek, Alblasserdam, South Holland, Netherlands. It was rated at 60nhp. The engine powered a single screw propeller.

History
Alcyon was built as yard number 163 by Bonn & Mees, Rotterdam, South Holland in 1904 for French owners. The Code Letters OBNH were allocated, as was the fishing boat registration B 2892. By 1930, she was owned by Bourgain-Vincent, Boulogne. In 1934, her Code Letters were changed to FNOH. She was sold to E. Malfoy & Fils in that year.

On 26 June 1940, Alcyon was seized by the Germans at La Rochelle, Charente-Inférieure. She was allocated to the Hafenschutz-Flotille Lorient on 2 November, serving as Boot 10 Alcyon. On 4 May 1942, Alcyon was redesignated as a vorpostenboot. She was allocated to 4 Vorpostenflotille as V 420 Alcyon. On 2 August 1943, she was sunk in the Gironde in an attack by British aircraft with the loss of five of her crew.

References

Sources

1904 ships
Ships built in Rotterdam
Merchant ships of France
Steamships of France
World War I merchant ships of France
World War II merchant ships of France
Auxiliary ships of the Kriegsmarine
Steamships of Germany
Maritime incidents in August 1943
World War II shipwrecks in the Atlantic Ocean
Shipwrecks in the Bay of Biscay
Ships sunk by British aircraft